Alpha/beta hydrolase domain containing 3 (ABHD3; alternative names: lung alpha/beta hydrolase 3, phospholipase ABHD3) is a single pass type II membrane member of the serine hydrolase family of enzymes. The expression of murine ABHD3 is highest in the brain, liver, and kidney. ABHD3 hydrolytic activity is highly specific for medium chain (e.g., dimyristoylphosphatidylcholine) and oxidatively truncated (e.g., azelaoyl PAF) phospholipids. ABHD3-deficient mice are viable, fertile, and possess dramatically elevated medium chain phospholipids in tissues and in blood. Conversely, ectopic expression of ABHD3 prevents the accumulation of oxidized phospholipids in cells.

References

Enzymes
Hydrolases